Anthony Lavar Hanshaw (born March 28, 1978) is an American professional boxer from 2000 to 2013. As an amateur, he won the 1998 National Golden Gloves at welterweight.

Amateur career
Hanshaw was born in Warren, Ohio, and graduated from Mansfield Senior High School in 1996. A naturally left-handed boxer who fights from the right-handed stance, he beat Sechew Powell, Kelly Pavlik, and Sergio Mora, but lost to Jermain Taylor.

Just before the 2000 Olympic trials, his father had an accident at work and died. Hanshaw did not qualify. He won the 1998 welterweight Golden Gloves and was 2000 U.S. National champion at 156 pounds.
His record was 300-22.

Professional career
Hanshaw turned professional in 2000, as a super middleweight, under powerful Shelly Finkel and started very actively with 11 fights in his first year as a professional. The Ring magazine featured him early on. He fought a credible opponent in July 2001 in previously undefeated middleweight Kingsley Ikeke and was awarded the narrow decision. Ikeke later had an IBF title shot at middleweight.

It took him until 2006 to step it up a little and beat Esteban Camou (19-1) and Lafarrell Bunteng (16-1-1). On January 5, 2007, he fought to a draw with undefeated Frenchman Jean Paul Mendy in a bout for the vacant IBO super middleweight title. A fight with Roy Jones Jr. took place on July 14, 2007, at the Mississippi Coast Coliseum in Biloxi, Mississippi, at a catch weight of 175 lb. Jones Jr. won the bout by decision after dropping Hanshaw in the 11th round.

Professional boxing record

|-
|align="center" colspan=8|23 Wins (14 knockouts, 9 decisions), 2 Losses (1 knockout, 1 decision), 1 Draw 
|-
| align="center" style="border-style: none none solid solid; background: #e3e3e3"|Result
| align="center" style="border-style: none none solid solid; background: #e3e3e3"|Record
| align="center" style="border-style: none none solid solid; background: #e3e3e3"|Opponent
| align="center" style="border-style: none none solid solid; background: #e3e3e3"|Type
| align="center" style="border-style: none none solid solid; background: #e3e3e3"|Round
| align="center" style="border-style: none none solid solid; background: #e3e3e3"|Date
| align="center" style="border-style: none none solid solid; background: #e3e3e3"|Location
| align="center" style="border-style: none none solid solid; background: #e3e3e3"|Notes
|-align=center
|Win
|
|align=left| William Gill
|UD
|8
|08/12/2012
|align=left| Benton Convention Center, Winston-Salem, North Carolina
|align=left|
|-
|Win
|
|align=left| John Micheal Terry
|UD
|6
|27/10/2012
|align=left| North Carolina Music Factory, Charlotte, North Carolina
|align=left|
|-
|Loss
|
|align=left| Andre Dirrell
|TKO
|5
|02/05/2008
|align=left| Chumash Casino, Santa Ynez, California
|align=left|
|-
|Loss
|
|align=left| Roy Jones Jr.
|UD
|12
|14/07/2007
|align=left| Mississippi Coast Coliseum, Biloxi, Mississippi
|align=left|
|-
|Draw
|
|align=left| Jean-Paul Mendy
|SD
|12
|05/01/2007
|align=left| DeSoto Civic Center, Southaven, Mississippi
|align=left|
|-
|Win
|
|align=left| Lafarrell Bunting
|TKO
|3
|06/10/2006
|align=left| Chumash Casino, Santa Ynez, California
|align=left|
|-
|Win
|
|align=left| Esteban Camou
|UD
|10
|04/08/2006
|align=left| PFTC Sports Center, Las Vegas, Nevada
|align=left|
|-
|Win
|
|align=left| James A. North
|UD
|6
|17/06/2006
|align=left| FedEx Forum, Memphis, Tennessee
|align=left|
|-
|Win
|
|align=left| Victor Maciel
|KO
|1
|16/07/2004
|align=left| Canton Memorial Civic Center, Canton, Ohio
|align=left|
|-
|Win
|
|align=left| Tyrus Armstead
|TKO
|3
|15/05/2004
|align=left| DePaul Athletic Center, Chicago, Illinois
|align=left|
|-
|Win
|
|align=left| Yameen Islam Muhammad
|TKO
|2
|16/04/2004
|align=left| Gund Arena, Cleveland, Ohio
|align=left|
|-
|Win
|
|align=left| Etianne Whitaker
|UD
|10
|16/07/2002
|align=left| Canton Civic Center, Canton, Ohio
|align=left|
|-
|Win
|
|align=left| Dana Rucker
|UD
|10
|22/02/2002
|align=left| Schottenstein Center, Columbus, Ohio
|align=left|
|-
|Win
|
|align=left| Mack Willis
|TKO
|2
|01/12/2001
|align=left| Mountaineer Casino, Racetrack and Resort, Chester, West Virginia
|align=left|
|-
|Win
|
|align=left| Kingsley Ikeke
|UD
|10
|20/07/2001
|align=left| Canton Civic Center, Canton, Ohio
|align=left|
|-
|Win
|
|align=left| Bertrand Tchandjeu
|TKO
|1
|20/04/2001
|align=left| Bally's Park Place, Atlantic City, New Jersey
|align=left|
|-
|Win
|
|align=left| Jose Spearman
|TKO
|5
|02/02/2001
|align=left| Celeste Center, Columbus, Ohio
|align=left|
|-
|Win
|
|align=left| Juan Carlos Viloria
|UD
|8
|01/12/2000
|align=left| MGM Grand Garden Arena, Las Vegas, Nevada
|align=left|
|-
|Win
|
|align=left| Jeffrey Brownfield
|KO
|1
|10/11/2000
|align=left| Mandalay Bay, Las Vegas, Nevada
|align=left|
|-
|Win
|
|align=left| Demetrius Johnson
|TKO
|1
|20/10/2000
|align=left| The Palace of Auburn Hills, Auburn Hills, Michigan
|align=left|
|-
|Win
|
|align=left| Ronald Boddie
|UD
|6
|06/10/2000
|align=left| Bally's Park Place, Atlantic City, New Jersey
|align=left|
|-
|Win
|
|align=left| Delfino Marin
|TKO
|1
|23/09/2000
|align=left| Packard Music Hall, Warren, Ohio
|align=left|
|-
|Win
|
|align=left| Eric Howard
|TKO
|2
|26/08/2000
|align=left| Mandalay Bay, Las Vegas, Nevada
|align=left|
|-
|Win
|
|align=left| Emil Williams
|TKO
|1
|05/08/2000
|align=left| Mohegan Sun, Uncasville, Connecticut
|align=left|
|-
|Win
|
|align=left| Predrag Cvetanovic
|KO
|1
|15/07/2000
|align=left| Buchmuller Park, Secaucus, New Jersey
|align=left|
|-
|Win
|
|align=left| Richard Glen Bingham
|TKO
|1
|16/06/2000
|align=left| Mandalay Bay, Las Vegas, Nevada
|align=left|
|}

References

External links
 

1978 births
Living people
National Golden Gloves champions
Sportspeople from Massillon, Ohio
Boxers from Ohio
Sportspeople from Warren, Ohio
American male boxers
Light-heavyweight boxers